Avondale is a rural town and locality in the Bundaberg Region, Queensland, Australia. In the  the locality of Avondale had a population of 643 people.

Geography 
Avondale is farming and grazing land. The Kolan River forms the southern and eastern boundary of the locality. The North Coast railway line passes through the north-east of the locality where the town of Avondale is located. The town is served by the Avondale railway station.

History 
The area was originally known as Kolan. However, on 19 March 1931, the name was changed to Avondale to match the railway station name, which took its name from an adjacent property.

In September 1891, the Avondale Estate was advertised for auction by W.E.Curtis, consisting of 66 agricultural farms from 25 to 45 acres each; 100 quarter acre lots and a few garden lots from 2 1/2 to 4 acres each. A map advertising the sale stated that the auctioneer was instructed by the owners Messrs Brown & Johnston to sell by public auction at his rooms, Bundaberg, Saturday Sept. 26th, 1891 subs. of por. 5, 9 & 10, Parish of Yandaran, County of Cook, Q'land, and 100 quarter-acre lots, and some garden lots, in same por. & farms 25 & 45 acres each. "The estate is bounded on three sides by salt water, viz Kolan River and Yandaran Creek, both of which are navigable". The map states the Estate is only 16 miles from Bundaberg connected by railway.

The Avondale Provisional School was opened on 8 February 1895. It became Avondale State School on 1 January 1909.

In the  the locality of Avondale had a population of 643 people.

Heritage listings 
The heritage-listed sites in Avondale include:

 Corner of Avondale Road and Mullers Road): Avondale Cemetery

Education 
The Avondale State School is a government co-educational primary school (P-6) at 371 Avondale Road. In 2016, the school had an enrolment of 20 students with 2 teachers and 4 non-teaching staff (2 equivalent full-time). The school opened its doors on 8 February 1895.

References

External links 

 

Bundaberg Region
Localities in Queensland